Reality Has Got Me Tied Up is the second and final album by American G-funk group The Dove Shack. It featured guest appearances from Nate Dogg, Kam, Bad Azz, Goldie Loc, Baby Boy, Lil J, Madom Dree. The record did not hit any major music chart.

Track listing 

Sample credits
Track 4 contains elements from "Funkin' for Jamaica (N.Y.)" by Tom Browne (1980) and "That's the Way (I Like It)" by KC & the Sunshine Band (1975)
Track 5 contains elements from "Hold On" by En Vogue (1990) and "Eeny, meeny, miny, moe"

References

External links

2006 albums
G-funk albums
The Dove Shack albums